Aconodes is a genus of longhorn beetles of the subfamily Lamiinae, containing the following species:

 Aconodes affinis (Breuning, 1940)
 Aconodes bilobatus (Breuning, 1939)
 Aconodes bulbosus Breuning, 1956
 Aconodes costatus (Guérin-Méneville, 1843)
 Aconodes euphorbiae Holzschuh, 2003
 Aconodes latefasciatus Holzschuh, 1984   
 Aconodes lima Holzschuh, 1989
 Aconodes montanus Pascoe, 1857
 Aconodes multituberculatus (Breuning, 1947)
 Aconodes nepalensis Heyrovský, 1976
 Aconodes obliquatus (Breuning, 1939)
 Aconodes pedongensis Breuning, 1956
 Aconodes persimilis (Breuning, 1939)
 Aconodes piniphilus Holzschuh, 2003
 Aconodes sikkimensis (Breuning, 1940)
 Aconodes subaequalis (Aurivillius, 1922)
 Aconodes submontanus (Breuning, 1949)
 Aconodes truncatus (Breuning, 1939)
 Aconodes tuberculatus (Breuning, 1940)

References

 
Morimopsini